The American Music Award for Favorite Song – Pop/Rock (formerly known as Favorite Pop/Rock Single 1974–1995) has been awarded since 1974. The category was retired for over a decade in 1995, before returning in the 2016 ceremony. Years reflect the year in which the awards were presented, for works released in the previous year (until 2003 onward when awards were handed out in November of the same year). The all-time winner for this category is tied between the following four artists: Justin Bieber, Boyz II Men, Whitney Houston and Lionel Richie, with 2 wins each.

Winners and nominees

1970s

1980s

1990s

2010s

2020s

Category facts

Multiple wins
 2 wins
 Justin Bieber
 Boyz II Men
 Whitney Houston
 Lionel Richie

Multiple nominations
 3 nominations
 Justin Bieber

 2 nominations
 Adele
 Bon Jovi
 Debby Boone
 Boyz II Men
 Whitney Houston
 Elton John
 Dua Lipa
 Madonna
 Lionel Richie
 Diana Ross
 Steve Winwood
 Ed Sheeran
 Halsey
 The Weeknd

References

American Music Awards
Pop music awards
Rock music awards
Song awards
Awards established in 1974
1974 establishments in the United States
Awards established in 2016
Awards disestablished in 1995